Guy-Roger Nzeng (born 30 May 1970) is a Gabonese former professional footballer who played as a defender.

Nzeng was a member of the Gabon squad for the 1996 and 2000 Africa Cup of Nations.

References

External links

1970 births
Living people
Gabonese footballers
Gabon international footballers
2000 African Cup of Nations players
1996 African Cup of Nations players
Gabonese expatriate footballers
Orlando Pirates F.C. players
Paniliakos F.C. players
AmaZulu F.C. players
FC 105 Libreville players
Gabonese expatriate sportspeople in Greece
Gabonese expatriate sportspeople in South Africa
Expatriate footballers in Greece
Expatriate soccer players in South Africa
Association football defenders
21st-century Gabonese people